The Faroe Islands Cup (literally the Prime Minister Cup) is the main football cup competition in the Faroe Islands. The first edition was played in 1955.

History

The HB–TB decade
The first decade of the competition was marked by the alternance of titles between HB and TB. Only in its eleventh year, the cup saw a different champion, with B36 defeating rivals HB in the final.

Subsequent years
In the subsequent editions, the other former finalists also got their first titles; KÍ in 1966, and VB in 1974.

1970 was the only time a final was not played, as the Faroe Islands Sports Association (ÍSF) choose to annul the competition after KÍ, and later VB, refused to play against HB in Tórshavn. HB continued to enjoy success, but TB won the competition just once after the first decade, in 1977.

In 1979 the Faroe Islands Football Association was founded and took over the organization of the competition, opening the cup to teams from every division.

In the 1980s new champions were crowned, with GÍ winning in 1983 and NSÍ in 1985; and the 1990s also had its first-time winners with B71's title in 1993.

The construction of the national stadium Tórsvøllur saw the majority of the finals being played there since 2000.

HB drought and the Víkingur−EB/Streymur rivalry
Frequent winners HB went through what was then their longest period without a cup title, not winning for five years, between 1999 and 2003. This ended in the club's centenary year, when they defeated NSÍ in the final. But the club entered in a longer drought, which ended in 2019, where they defeated Víkingur in the final.

From 2007 until 2015 the competition was dominated by EB/Streymur and Víkingur, similar to the HB–TB period. The two teams alternated titles and made three finals, all won by Víkingur.

KÍ put an end to this period defeating Víkingur on penalties in the 2016 final.

Finals

Winners

The clubs in italics no longer exist.

Notes

References

External links
Cup at FSF website 
Cup at Soccerway

 
National association football cups
1
Recurring sporting events established in 1955
1955 establishments in the Faroe Islands